SS Redesmere was a small freighter built during the First World War. Completed in 1915, she was intended for the West African trade. The ship was sunk by the German submarine SM U-70 in October 1917.

Description 
She had a vertical triple-expansion steam engine driving a single screw propeller. The engine was rated at a total of 226 nominal horsepower and produced .

Construction and career 
Redesmere, named after Redes Mere, was laid down as yard number 266 by the Sunderland Shipbuilding Co. at its shipyard in Sunderland for the Watson Steamship Co. The ship was launched on 7 September 1911 and completed on 5 October. She was sold to the Lever Brothers' newly formed Bromport Steamship Co. on 11 May 1916.

References

Bibliography

Ships built on the River Wear
Steamships of the United Kingdom
Maritime incidents in 1917
World War I merchant ships of the United Kingdom
1911 ships
Ships of the Bromport Steamship Company